The Southern Kern Unified School District is a school district in Kern County that serves the unincorporated Northern Antelope Valley communities of Rosamond and Willow Springs, California (USA).

The Southern Kern Unified School District has 8 schools:
 2 elementary schools
 1 junior high school
 1 high school
 2 independent study also known as home schools
 2 alternative education schools

List of schools

Elementary schools
Rosamond Elementary School
Westpark Elementary School

Junior high schools
Tropico Middle School

High schools
Rosamond High School

Independent Study
Abraham Lincoln Independent Study
Home Choice

Alternative Education Schools
Opportunity Middle School
Rare Earth High School

See also
List of school districts in California
Muroc Joint Unified School District
Mojave Unified School District

References

External links

School districts in Kern County, California